Northwestern School of Law may refer to:

Northwestern School of Law of Lewis & Clark College, now known as Lewis & Clark Law School, in Portland, Oregon
Northwestern University Pritzker School of Law, in Chicago, Illinois